= Maria Ana Baptista =

Portuguese geophysicist

Maria Ana Viana Baptista is a Portuguese geophysical scientist who is known for her work on earthquakes and tsunamis.

== Education and career ==
Baptista got her undergraduate degree in Physics from the University of Lisbon in 1984. She received her master's in geophysical sciences in 1993 from the University of Lisbon, and continued to earn a Ph.D. in physics and geophysics in 1998 from the University of Lisbon. She specialized in geophysics, in which she did her thesis, "Genese Propagação e Impacte de tsunamis na costa portuguesa", about the effects of tsunamis on the Portuguese coast.

In 2017 Baptista became an Invited Associate Professor at the University of Lisbon. In 2021 Baptista was named an executive editor of Natural Hazards and Earth System Sciences.

== Research ==
Baptista’s studies mainly concern the causes and effects of natural disasters such as earthquakes and tsunamis, and the social and economic impacts these disasters may have. Her research publications begin in 1991, where she studied two historic earthquakes causing destruction in her native capital Lisbon, occurring on November 1, 1775 and February 28, 1969. Baptista has documented the causes and effects of tsunamis in the Gulf of Cadiz of the coast of Portugal, and aimed to remove the uncertainty of the Great Lisbon Earthquake of 1775 by using tsunami parameters rather than the conventional seismic-based approach to uncover the epicenter of the earthquake.

== Honors and wards ==
In 2010 Baptista received the Tsunami Society Award for her work in setting up a tsunami early warning system in the northwestern Atlantic Ocean.

== Selected publications ==
- Baptista, M. A.; Miranda, P. M. A.; Miranda, J. M.; Victor, L. Mendes (1998-01-01). "Constrains on the source of the 1755 Lisbon tsunami inferred from numerical modelling of historical data on the source of the 1755 Lisbon tsunami". Journal of Geodynamics. 25 (1): 159–174. Bibcode:1998JGeo...25..159B. doi:10.1016/S0264-3707(97)00020-3. ISSN 0264-3707.
- Baptista, M. A.; Heitor, S.; Miranda, J. M.; Miranda, P.; Victor, L. Mendes (1998-01-01). "The 1755 Lisbon tsunami; evaluation of the tsunami parameters". Journal of Geodynamics. 25 (1): 143–157. Bibcode:1998JGeo...25..143B. doi:10.1016/S0264-3707(97)00019-7. ISSN 0264-3707.
- Baptista, Maria Ana; Costa, Paula Teves; Matias, Luís; Miranda, Jorge Miguel; Cabral, João; Terrinha, Pedro (2005). Terramotos e Tsunamis (in European Portuguese). ISBN 9789725930168.
- Baptista, M. A.; Miranda, J. M. (2009-01-09). "Revision of the Portuguese catalog of tsunamis". Natural Hazards and Earth System Sciences. 9 (1): 25–42. Bibcode:2009NHESS...9...25B. doi:10.5194/nhess-9-25-2009. hdl:10400.21/1265. ISSN 1684-9981.
- Omira, R.; Ramalho, R. S.; Kim, J.; González, P. J.; Kadri, U.; Miranda, J. M.; Carrilho, F.; Baptista, M. A. (2022-09-22). "Global Tonga tsunami explained by a fast-moving atmospheric source". Nature. 609 (7928): 734–740. Bibcode:2022Natur.609..734O. doi:10.1038/s41586-022-04926-4. ISSN 0028-0836. PMC 9492550. PMID 35697059.
